Oberteuringen is a town in the district of Bodensee in Baden-Württemberg, south-west Germany.

It lies some 8 km north of the Bodensee (Lake Constance) and 4 km east of Mount Gehrenberg. Nearby towns are Markdorf (6 km), Friedrichshafen (7 km), Tettnang (11 km), and Ravensburg (12 km).

The Oberteuringen council district includes the villages of Bibruck, Bitzenhofen, Hefigkofen, Neuhaus, Rammetshofen, Remette, Unterteuringen,  and Vittenhaag.

References 

Bodenseekreis